Tresham is an English surname of Norman origins. The Treshams originally lived in Northampton. Near Northampton, is the village of Tresham, Gloucestershire.

Notable people with this surname
Francis Tresham (c.1567–1605), Conspirator to commit regicide in the Gunpowder Plot
Francis Tresham (game designer), United Kingdom-based board game designer
Henry Tresham (c.1751–1814), Irish-born historical painter active in London in the late 18th century
Thomas Tresham (speaker) (died 1471), English politician, soldier and administrator
Thomas Tresham (died 1559), English Catholic politician during the middle of the Tudor dynasty
Thomas Tresham (died 1605) (1534–1605), English Catholic recusant politician
William Tresham (died 1450), English lawyer and Speaker of the House of Commons
William Tresham (priest) (1495–1569), English priest in the Tudor period and an official of the University of Oxford

References